Olena Oleksandrivna Kucher-Topolya (born 14 May 1986), better known by her stage name Alyosha, is a Ukrainian singer.

Career

Early life
Alyosha was born on 14 May 1986 in Zaporizhia. She studied vocals at the Kyiv National University of Culture and Arts and signed with the Catapult Music record label in 2008.

2010: Ukraine in the Eurovision Song Contest 2010

On 20 March 2010, Alyosha won the Ukrainian National Final and thus represented Ukraine in the Eurovision Song Contest 2010. She replaced Vasyl Lazarovych who was originally picked on December 29, 2009, to represent Ukraine. After some political changes that took place in Ukraine his candidacy was withdrawn on March 15 under suspicion that he was picked with the help of the current director of the State National Television (1st National) Vasyl Ilashchuk. The petition to organize another concourse and to cancel the current results was signed by several Ukrainian performers such as Taisia Povaliy, Ruslana Pysanka, and Kostyantyn Meladze.

Originally, she was due to participate in the contest with the song "To Be Free". Later on, it came to the light that the winning song has been available for purchase (under the name of Alonya) at Amazon.de since 12 April 2008. This would break the rules of the Eurovision Song Contest. A new song, "Sweet People", was chosen, two days after the 22 March deadline had passed, so NTU was fined by the EBU. Alyosha performed in the second semi-final on 27 May 2010, where she progressed to the final. In the final Alyosha finished 10th with 108 points.

Charts

References

External links

Official page

1986 births
Living people
Eurovision Song Contest entrants of 2010
Eurovision Song Contest entrants for Ukraine
People from Zaporizhzhia
21st-century Ukrainian women singers
Ukrainian pop singers
English-language singers from Ukraine